The 2017 BetVictor World Matchplay was the 24th annual staging of the World Matchplay, organised by the Professional Darts Corporation. The tournament took place at the Winter Gardens, Blackpool, from 22 to 30 July 2017.

Michael van Gerwen was the two-times defending champion but lost to Phil Taylor 16–6 in the quarter-finals, with Taylor then going on to beat Peter Wright 18–8 in the final to claim his 16th World Matchplay Championship. It was Taylor's final appearance in this tournament and his last major tournament win.

Prize money
The prize fund increased from £450,000 to £500,000, with the winner's earnings increasing from £100,000 to £115,000.

Format
In previous stagings of the event all games had to be won by two clear legs with no sudden-death legs. However, in 2013 after consulting the host broadcaster Sky Sports, the PDC decided that games will now only proceed for a maximum of six extra legs before a tie-break leg is required. For example, in a best of 19 legs first round match, if the score reaches 12–12 then the 25th leg will be the decider.

Qualification
The top 16 players on the PDC Order of Merit as of July 10, 2017 were seeded for the tournament. The top 16 players on the ProTour Order of Merit not to have already qualified will be unseeded.

The following players qualified for the tournament:

PDC Order of Merit Top 16
  Michael van Gerwen (quarter-finals)
  Gary Anderson (second round)
  Peter Wright (runner-up)
  Adrian Lewis (semi-finals)
  Dave Chisnall (second round)
  James Wade (first round)
  Mensur Suljović (quarter-finals)
  Phil Taylor (winner)
  Raymond van Barneveld (second round)
  Jelle Klaasen (first round)
  Michael Smith (first round)
  Kim Huybrechts (first round)
  Ian White (first round)
  Robert Thornton (first round)
  Benito van de Pas (first round)
  Simon Whitlock (second round)

PDC ProTour qualifiers
  Daryl Gurney (semi-finals)
  Alan Norris (quarter-finals)
  Joe Cullen (first round)
  Rob Cross (second round)
  Mervyn King (first round)
  Gerwyn Price (first round)
  Cristo Reyes (second round)
  Stephen Bunting (first round)
  Darren Webster (quarter-finals)
  Steve Beaton (first round)
  James Wilson (first round)
  Steve West (second round)
  Kyle Anderson (first round)
  John Henderson (first round)
  Christian Kist (first round)
  Justin Pipe (second round)

Draw

Statistics
{|class="wikitable sortable" style="font-size: 95%; text-align: right"
|-
! Player
! Eliminated
! Played
! Legs Won
! Legs Lost
! LWAT
! 100+
! 140+
! 180s
! High checkout
! 3-dart average
! Checkout success
|-
|align="left"|  Phil Taylor
| Winner
| 5
| 
| 
| 
| 
| 
| 
| 151
| 101.03
| 48.37%
|-
|align="left"|  Peter Wright
| Final
| 5
| 
| 
| 
| 
| 
| 
| 147
| 97.46
| 41.36%
|-
|align="left"|  Daryl Gurney
| Semi-finals
| 4
| 
| 
|
| 
| 
| 
| 146
| 97.96
| 43.18%
|-
|align="left"|  Adrian Lewis
| Semi-finals
| 4
| 
| 
| 
| 
| 
| 
| 144
| 95.92
| 42.69%
|-
|align="left"|  Michael van Gerwen
| Quarter-finals
| 3
| 
| 
| 
| 
| 
| 
| 160
| 99.86
| 34.49%
|-
|align="left"|  Mensur Suljović
| Quarter-finals
| 3
| 
| 
|
| 
| 
| 
| 148
| 96.48
| 48.52%
|-
|align="left"|  Darren Webster
| Quarter-finals
| 3
| 
| 
| 
| 
| 
| 
| 133
| 95.81
| 36.95%
|-
|align="left"|  Alan Norris
| Quarter-finals
| 3
| 
| 
| 
| 
| 
| 
| 155
| 93.51
| 38.71%
|-
|align="left"|  Gary Anderson
| Second round
| 2
| 
| 
| 
| 
| 
| 
| 104
| 103.56
| 35.24%
|-
|align="left"|  Rob Cross
| Second round
| 2
| 
| 
| 
| 
| 
| 
| 125
| 99.90
| 44.70%
|-
|align="left"|  Steve West
| Second round
| 2
| 
| 
| 
| 
| 
| 
| 135
| 97.67
| 42.33%
|-
|align="left"|  Cristo Reyes
| Second round
| 2
| 
| 
| 
| 
| 
| 
| 116
| 97.48
| 49.41%
|-
|align="left"|  Dave Chisnall
|Second round
| 2
| 
| 
| 
| 
| 
| 
| 121
| 96.03
| 31.13%
|-
|align="left"|  Raymond van Barneveld
|Second round
| 2
| 
| 
|
| 
| 
| 
| 124
| 95.67
| 27.38%
|-
|align="left"|  Simon Whitlock
| Second round
| 2
| 
| 
|
| 
| 
| 
| 119
| 93.57
| 35.00%
|-
|align="left"|  Justin Pipe
|Second round
| 2
| 
| 
| 
| 
| 
| 
| 120
| 91.51
| 29.26%
|-
|align="left"|  Christian Kist
| First round
| 1
| 7
| 10
| 
| 16
| 12
| 9
| 100
| 99.96
| 43.75%
|-
|align="left"|  Joe Cullen
| First round
| 1
| 8
| 10
| 
| 20
| 10
| 5
| 150
| 96.95
| 44.44%
|-
|align="left"|  Kyle Anderson
| First round
| 1
| 5
| 10
| 
| 19
| 3
| 6
| 105
| 96.64
| 55.56%
|-
|align="left"|  James Wade
| First round
| 1
| 11
| 13
| 
| 42
| 18
| 2
| 121
| 96.08
| 55.00%
|-
|align="left"|  Michael Smith
| First round
| 1
| 5
| 10
| 
| 18
| 6
| 4
| 80
| 95.45
| 45.45%
|-
|align="left"|  Ian White
| First round
| 1
| 7
| 10
| 
| 22
| 17
| 2
| 74
| 94.61
| 30.43%
|-
|align="left"|  Stephen Bunting
| First round
| 1
| 4
| 10
| 
| 16
| 11
| 3
| 102
| 94.54
| 22.22%
|-
|align="left"|  Steve Beaton
| First round
| 1
| 7
| 10
| 
| 22
| 12
| 1
| 100
| 94.51
| 43.75%
|-
|align="left"|  Kim Huybrechts
| First round
| 1
| 6
| 10
| 
| 21
| 8
| 5
| 72
| 93.45
| 28.57%
|-

|align="left"|  Robert Thornton
| First round
| 1
| 3
| 10
| 
| 15
| 8
| 1
| 62
| 90.82
| 25.00%
|-
|align="left"|  James Wilson
| First round
| 1
| 8
| 10
| 
| 22
| 10
| 4
| 127
| 90.51
| 33.33%
|-
|align="left"|  Benito van de Pas
| First round
| 1
| 9
| 11
| 
| 28
| 16
| 1
| 170
| 89.53
| 27.27%
|-
|align="left"|  Jelle Klaasen
| First round
| 1
| 5
| 10
| 
| 16
| 8
| 3
| 76
| 89.34
| 26.32%
|-
|align="left"|  Mervyn King
| First round
| 1
| 7
| 10
| 
| 13
| 13
| 3
| 90
| 89.22
| 28.00%
|-
|align="left"|  Gerwyn Price
| First round
| 1
| 7
| 10
| 
| 20
| 7
| 1
| 170
| 88.68
| 31.25%
|-
|align="left"|  John Henderson
| First round
| 1
| 4
| 10
| 
| 18
| 9
| 1
| 97
| 86.35
| 30.77%
|-

References 

World Matchplay (darts)
World Matchplay
World Matchplay
World Matchplay